Crickets is the eighth studio album by American country music artist Joe Nichols, released on October 8, 2013 by Red Bow Records. It includes a cover of Merle Haggard's "Footlights". The album sold 12,330 albums its first week.

Mickey Jack Cones produced the entire album, co-producing with Tony Brown on "Yeah" and "Billy Graham's Bible", and Derek George on all other tracks.

Critical reception

Crickets garnered generally positive reception from the ratings and reviews of music critics. Stephen Thomas Erlewine of AllMusic rated the album three stars out of five, remarking how "All of Crickets is peppered with these kind of off-hand references to the modern world, but Nichols' true tell is the bright, affable sound of the record, how it finds a cozy middle ground between his burnished signature and the hyper-stylized, over-sized country of new millennial sports bars." In addition, Erlewine says "his true strengths are rooted in the past, not the present." At Country Weekly, Jon Freeman graded the album a B, indicating how "At times, the overstuffed (at 16 tracks) album struggles to keep the memorable hooks coming, opting instead for generic tales of women on creek banks." Also, Freeman writes that "the beloved neotraditionalist may surprise some listeners by trying on some contemporary clothes." Markos Papadatos of Digital Journal graded the album an A+, highlighting how the listener "can really hear Nichols' heart on this album and his love for the country genre" because Nichols' "leaves his fans yearning for more." Furthermore, Papadatos states Nichols' is "stronger than ever" on a release that "contains 16 songs", which "is a real treat and its production is brilliant." At Roughstock, Ashley Cooke rated the album four stars out of five, calling Nichols' a "completely underrated" musician, and this is evidenced by the "jammed packed album with many different songs and while some of the songs do fall within the cliché of country music out there, the delivery is different", which this is done with a "sound [that] is authentic and his vocals are smooth."

Track listing

Personnel
Eddie Bayers - drums
The Brentwood Good Ole Boys Choir - background vocals on "Open Up a Can"
Pat Buchanan - electric guitar
Mickey Jack Cones - acoustic guitar, electric guitar, percussion, background vocals
J.T. Corenflos - electric guitar
Scott Ducaj - trumpet on "Gotta Love It"
Jeneé Fleenor - fiddle
Larry Franklin - fiddle, mandolin
Paul Franklin - steel guitar
Derek George - acoustic guitar, electric guitar, keyboards, programming, background vocals
Kenny Greenberg - acoustic guitar
Tony Harrell - keyboards
Aubrey Haynie - fiddle, mandolin
Wes Hightower - background vocals
Mark Hill - bass guitar
Jim Horn - baritone saxophone and tenor saxophone on "Gotta Love It"
Mike Johnson - steel guitar, dobro on "Crickets"
Troy Lancaster - electric guitar
B. James Lowry - acoustic guitar, 10-string acoustic guitar, ganjo
Brent Mason - electric guitar
Steve Nathan - Hammond B-3 organ, keyboards
Joe Nichols - lead vocals
Russ Pahl - steel guitar
Charles Rose - trombone on "Gotta Love It"
Jimmie Lee Sloas - bass guitar
Bryan Sutton - acoustic guitar
Biff Watson - acoustic guitar
The Wild Wild Western Women - background vocals on "Open Up a Can"
Lonnie Wilson - drums
Casey Wood - percussion, programming
Glenn Worf - bass guitar

Chart performance

Album

Singles

References

2013 albums
Joe Nichols albums
BBR Music Group albums
Albums produced by Derek George